George "Adam" Klein IV (born November 29, 1988) is an American swimmer.  At the 2009 US National Championships and World Championship Trials, Klein placed second to Eric Shanteau in the 200m breaststroke with a time of 2:10.39, earning a place to compete at the 2009 World Aquatics Championships in Rome.  In Rome, Klein was disqualified from the 200m breaststroke preliminaries.  Klein also competed in the 50m breaststroke and placed 50th (out of 148 swimmers in the event).

Klein attended Auburn University and trained under head coach Brett Hawke.  Klein is a 2007 graduate of Archbishop Rummel High School in Metairie, Louisiana.

References

External links
 
 Adam Klein – Auburn Tigers athlete bio

1988 births
Living people
American male swimmers
Auburn Tigers men's swimmers
Sportspeople from Jackson, Mississippi
Sportspeople from New Orleans
Universiade medalists in swimming
American people of German descent
Universiade silver medalists for the United States
Medalists at the 2011 Summer Universiade